Blaž Mahkovic (born March 21, 1990) is a Slovenian professional basketball player for Helios Suns of the Slovenian League. He is a 2.01 m tall forward.

International career
Mahkovic made his debut for the Slovenian national team on November 24, 2017, at the 2019 FIBA Basketball World Cup qualification game against Belarus national team.

References

External links
 Union Olimpija Profile
 Eurobasket.com profile

1990 births
Living people
KK Igokea players
KK Krka players
KK Olimpija players
Power forwards (basketball)
Slovenian men's basketball players
Small forwards
Sportspeople from Kranj
Helios Suns players